The Crystal Hotel (formerly Hotel Alma) is a hotel located in downtown Portland, Oregon. Originally named the Hotel Alma, the building is listed on the National Register of Historic Places. The property is operated by McMenamins.

History
Built in 1911 as the Hotel Alma, the building housed a hotel above and auto-focused business on busy Burnside. After World War II hosting the Club Mecca and later the Desert Room, which became a hallmark of vice within a US Senate hearing. By 1978, the building housed a gay bathhouse (Club Portland), and a gay bar, later known as Silverado.

After an extensive renovation and restoration, McMenamins opened the hotel on May 3, 2011.

References

External links
 
 Official site

1911 establishments in Oregon
Buildings designated early commercial in the National Register of Historic Places
Hotel buildings completed in 1911
Hotel buildings on the National Register of Historic Places in Portland, Oregon
Hotels in Portland, Oregon
McMenamins
Southwest Portland, Oregon